Prats may refer to:

Places
 Prats, Andorra, a village in Andorra
 Prats, a village in the municipality of Prats i Sansor, Catalonia
 Prats de Lluçanès, a town in Catalonia
 Prats-de-Mollo-la-Preste, a village in Pyrénées Orientales, France
 Els Prats de Rei, a village in Catalonia
 Prats-de-Sournia, a village in Pyrénées Orientales, France
 Saint-Seurin-de-Prats, a village in Aquitane, France

People
Abdón Prats (born 1992), Spanish footballer
Antonio Prats Cervera (born 1971), Spanish footballer
Camille Prats (born 1985), Filipino actress
 Carlos Prats (1915-1974), Chilean politician and military officer
Esteban Prats (1873-?), Cuban baseball player
Ivelisse Prats Ramírez, Dominican politician
Jaime Prats (1883-1946), Cuban musician and composer
 Joan Prats (1891-1970), Catalan art promoter
 John Prats (born 1984), Filipino actor
Jorge Luis Prats (born 1956), Cuban pianist
Juan Prats (c.1800-ca.1870), Spanish landowner and politician, mayor of Ponce, Puerto Rico
Matías Prats Cañete (1913-2004), Spanish journalist and newscaster
Matías Prats Luque (born 1952), Spanish journalist and newscaster, son of Matías Prats Cañete
Miguel Prats, Cuban baseball player
Óscar Prats (born 1989), Spanish footballer
Pol Prats (born 1999), Spanish footballer
Roberto Prats (born 1966), Puerto Rican politician
Rodrigo Prats (1909-1980), Cuban musician and composer, son of Jaime Prats
Úrsula Prats (born 1959), Mexican actress

Other
 The Prats, a Scottish punk rock group